Felix Higl (born 8 January 1997) is a German professional footballer who plays as a forward for  club VfL Osnabrück.

Career
Born in Cologne, Higl played youth football for Eintracht Freiburg, SC Freiburg and TSG Hoffenheim before joining Freiburger FC in 2014. He made 1 senior appearance for Freiburger FC during the 2014–15 season, coming on as a substitute in a 1–1 Oberliga Baden-Württemberg draw with SV Spielberg in March 2015. He spent the 2015–16 season with the under-19s of 1. FC Heidenheim, before joining Bahlinger SC on a three-year contract in summer 2016. After 10 goals in 74 appearances for Bahlinger SC, Higl signed for Regionalliga Südwest club SSV Ulm in January 2019 on a two-and-a-half year contract. Across two and a half seasons at Ulm, he scored 27 in 69 games.

In June 2021, Higl signed for VfL Osnabrück of the 3. Liga on a two-year contract.

Personal life
Higl is the son of former Bundesliga player Alfons Higl.

References

External links

1997 births
Living people
German footballers
Footballers from Cologne
Association football forwards
SC Freiburg players
TSG 1899 Hoffenheim players
Freiburger FC players
1. FC Heidenheim players
Bahlinger SC players
SSV Ulm 1846 players
VfL Osnabrück players
3. Liga players
Regionalliga players
Oberliga (football) players